Ally Maki Matsumura (born December 29, 1986), known professionally as Ally Maki, is an American actress and model. She portrayed Jess Kato in the TBS comedy series Wrecked and the voice of Giggle McDimples in Toy Story 4.

Career
Maki was scouted at 14 by a talent agent in Seattle. In 2001, she moved to a communal home for artists in Santa Clarita, California. From there, she was recruited by Columbia Records to form the girl band The Valli Girls, for whom she played the keytar. As part of her training, she took DJ lessons at Freakbeat Records.

Maki is known for appearing in the television film iCarly: iGo to Japan (2008), as well as her many cameo appearances in films and television series, such as Step Up 3D (2010). She had supporting roles in the comedy-drama films The Family Tree (2011) and Geography Club (2013).

From 2009 to 2010, Maki had a recurring role as Dawn in the comedy-drama series 10 Things I Hate About You. Maki made a guest appearance in a S4 episode of Bones as Dr. Tanaka, a forensic specialist from Japan. She was in the final considerations to play the role of Alice in the 2012 drama film The Perks of Being a Wallflower, which eventually went to Erin Wilhelmi.

Between 2016 and 2018, she has starred as Jess Kato in the TBS comedy series Wrecked. From 2018 to 2019, she had a recurring supporting role in Marvel's Cloak & Dagger on Freeform.

She founded the "Asian American Girl Club" fashion brand in 2018.

Personal life 
Maki was born and raised in Kirkland, Washington.

Maki is a fourth generation Japanese American, or Yonsei. Her grandmother, Miyo, was held in the Japanese internment camp at Heart Mountain Relocation Center, WY during World War II. Her grandfather was a part of the 442nd infantry regiment, a unit consisting of primarily Japanese American soldiers. She is the great-granddaughter of a sharecropper in Mountain View, California. She has two older brothers.

"Maki" is her middle name and the first name of her great-grandmother.

Filmography

Film

Television

Web series

References

External links
 

21st-century American actresses
American actresses of Japanese descent
American film actresses
American film actors of Asian descent
American television actresses
American models
Living people
Place of birth missing (living people)
1986 births
People from Kirkland, Washington
Actresses from Seattle